

D

E

References

Sources

 

 
 
 
 
 

 
 

 

 

 
 

 
 

 

 

 

 

 

 

 

Heroes in Norse myths and legends
Germanic heroic legends